Ó Meachair or O'Meachair (anglicised as Mahar, Maher, Mahir, Marr, Meagar, Meagher, O'Maher and O'Meagher) is a Gaelic Irish surname. Ó Meachair literally means grandson/descendent of ('O' prefix) the kind, generous or hospitable (Meachair). By the Irish name convention, this becomes "descendent of a kind, hospitable chief (clan leader)". The Ó Meachair sept was part of the Ely O'Carroll clan and was concentrated in the areas of Kilkenny and Tipperary, notably the Barony of Ikerrin in Ireland. Its common Irish pronunciation is Mar.

Naming conventions

People

Mahar
William F. Mahar Sr. (1919-2006), American politician
William F. Mahar Jr. (born 1947), American politician, son of the above

Maher

Marr
Johnny Marr (born 1963), né John Martin Maher, musician from Manchester in England

Meagher
 Aileen Meagher (1910–1987), Canadian athlete
 Edward Meagher (1908–1988), Australian politician
 Frank Meagher (born 1897–?), Irish name Prionsias Ó Meachair, Irish hurler
 Henry Meagher (1902–1982), Irish name Pádraig Ó Meachair, Irish hurler
 Jack Meagher (1896–1968), American football coach
 Jill Meagher (1982–2012), murder victim in Melbourne, Australia
 Jim Meagher, founder of Meagher Electronics
 John Meagher, several people, including:
John Meagher (born 1947), Irish architect, partner in De Blacam & Meagher
John Meagher (Canada East politician) (c. 1805–1876), Irish-born merchant and politician in Canada East
John F. Meagher (born 1948), Australian thoroughbred racehorse trainer
John W. Meagher (1917–1996), American soldier, Medal of Honor recipient
 Karen Meagher, English actress
 Lory Meagher (1899–1973), Irish hurler
 Margaret Meagher (1911–1999), Canadian diplomat
 Mary T. Meagher (born 1964), American swimmer
 Patrick Meagher (hurler) "Wedger" (1890-1958), Irish name Pádraig Ó Meachair, Irish hurler
 Ray Meagher (born 1944), Australian actor
 Reba Meagher (born 1967), Australian politician
 Rick Meagher (born 1953), Canadian ice hockey player
 Roderick Meagher (1932–2011), Australian jurist and judge
 Thomas Meagher, several people, including:
Thomas Meagher (merchant) (c. 1764–1837) Irish emigrant to Newfoundland, merchant and ship-owner
Thomas Meagher (MP) (1796–1874), Irish businessman and politician, mayor of Waterford and MP for Waterford, 1847–57
Thomas Francis Meagher (1823–1867), leader of the Young Irelander Rebellion of 1848, Union general, acting Governor of the Montana Territory
Thomas William Meagher (1902–1979), Australian medical practitioner, Lord Mayor of Perth, Western Australia
 William Meagher (1903–1981), American lawyer
 Willie Meagher (1895–1957), Irish name Liam Ó Meachair, Irish hurler

Other
Fr Meachair Cup, an Irish inter-collegiate camogie tournament

See also
Maher (Arabic name)
Mahir
Maher (god)

References

Bibliography
 Ní Mheachair, Gabrielle, Ó Meachair: The Story of a Clan, Ui Cairin Press (2014)

External links
 Maher Matters